Madysaurus (meaning "Madygen reptile") is an extinct genus of cynodonts which existed in Kyrgyzstan. It was first named by Leonid Petrovich Tatarinov in 2005. Madysaurus is known from the Madygen Formation, a Triassic Lagerstätte that also includes well-preserved remains of insects and small reptiles like Sharovipteryx and Longisquama. Madysaurus is one of the most primitive cynodonts and is placed in its own family, Madysauridae.

References 

Triassic synapsids of Asia
Middle Triassic synapsids
Prehistoric cynodont genera
Carnian genera
Fossils of Kyrgyzstan
 
Fossil taxa described in 2005
Taxa named by Leonid Petrovich Tatarinov